The British Firework Championships or National Firework Championships is an annual competition held in Plymouth, Devon, England, every August where judges review fireworks displays from professional fireworks companies and select the best examples.

It is watched by more than 200,000 people.

History

The competition was first held in 1997. Competitors set up their displays on the Mount Batten Breakwater which is closed to the public for the duration of the competition. The competition rules place restrictions on budget, duration and amount of ordinance that can be used for each display.

As part of the event's tenth anniversary in 2006, eight prior winners were invited to take part in a Champion of Champions competition. A lecturer from the University of Plymouth, Roy Lowry, attempted to break the world record of the highest number of rockets fired simultaneously with 55,000.

In 2012, no winner was declared due to bad weather in Plymouth. The 2013 event was a 'Champion of Champions' with the six previous winners being invited. This was postponed from 2012. Star Fireworks being crowned Champion of Champions.

2019 was expected to be a 'Champion of Champions' event, but only two of the winning companies from the 2013 - 2018 competitions accepted to take part.

Due to concerns about managing social distancing during the COVID-19 pandemic, the event was cancelled in 2020.

Winners
1997: Fantastic Fireworks
1998: Northern Lights Fireworks
1999: Happy Dragon Fireworks
2000: Pyro 1
2001: Shellscape Pyrotechnics
2002: Shellscape Pyrotechnics (second win)
2003: Jubilee Fireworks
2004: Alan Hillary Pyrotechnics now Reaction Fireworks
2005: MLE Pyrotechnics
2006, Champion of Champions winner: Jubilee Fireworks (second win)
2007: Selstar Fireworks 
2008: Pendragon Fireworks
2009: Phoenix Fireworks
2010: Star Fireworks
2011: MLE Pyrotechnics (second win)
2012: No winner declared due to bad weather.
2013, Champion of Champions winner: Star Fireworks (second win)
2014: Blitz Fireworks
2015: Fantastic Fireworks (second win)
2016: Gala Fireworks
2017: Selstar Fireworks (second win)
2018: Illusion Fireworks
2019: 1st Galaxy Fireworks were named as the 2019 winners and Selstar were named as The Champion of Champions.
2020: N/A
2021: Aurora Fireworks Ltd
2022: sonic fireworks

References

External links

British Firework Championships

Fireworks competitions
Plymouth, Devon
Festivals in Devon
Competitions in the United Kingdom
1997 establishments in England
Recurring events established in 1997
Annual events in the United Kingdom
National championships in the United Kingdom